Adrian Cosma (5 June 1950 – 1996) was a Romanian handball player who won the world title in 1974. He competed at the 1972, 1976 and 1980 Olympics and won one silver and two bronze medals. During his career he played 130 times for the national team and scored 250 goals.

References

External links 
 
 
 

1950 births
1996 deaths
CS Dinamo București (men's handball) players
Handball players at the 1972 Summer Olympics
Handball players at the 1976 Summer Olympics
Handball players at the 1980 Summer Olympics
Olympic handball players of Romania
Romanian male handball players
Olympic silver medalists for Romania
Olympic bronze medalists for Romania
Olympic medalists in handball
Medalists at the 1980 Summer Olympics
Medalists at the 1976 Summer Olympics
Medalists at the 1972 Summer Olympics